The Sermon on Exposition Boulevard is an album by American singer-songwriter Rickie Lee Jones, released in February 2007 on the independent New West label. It was produced by Lee Cantelon, Peter Atanasoff and Rob Schnapf, additional production by Bernie Larsen.

It was inspired by Lee Cantelon's book The Words, which contains the essential teachings of Jesus rewritten for a modern audience.

A special edition was also released, with an expanded booklet, a 5.1 surround mix, a Super Audio CD version of the record, MP3 copies of the album, and a 50-minute DVD that documents the project from its beginning.

Track listing
"Nobody Knows My Name" (Rickie Lee Jones, Lee Cantelon, Peter Atanasoff) – 3:24 	
"Gethsemane" (Jones, Atanasoff) – 2:23 	
"Falling Up" (Jones, Atanasoff) – 4:39 	
"Lamp of the Body" (Jones, Atanasoff) – 2:57 	
"It Hurts" (Jones, Atanasoff) – 3:45 	
"Where I Like It Best" (Jones, Cantelon, Atanasoff) – 5:44 	
"Tried to Be a Man" (Jones) – 3:44 	
"Circle in the Sand" (Jones, Cantelon, Atanasoff, Bernie Larsen) – 3:29 	
"Donkey Ride" (Jones, Atanasoff) – 2:52 	
"7th Day" (Jones) – 3:59 	
"Elvis Cadillac" (Jones, Atanasoff) – 3:57 	
"Road to Emmaus" (Cantelon, Atanasoff) – 4:18 	
"I Was There" (Jones) – 8:21

Personnel
Rickie Lee Jones – vocals, guitar, keyboards, synthesizer, percussions, toy xylophone, finger cymbals, electric piano, bowed dulcimer, tambourine
Bernie Larsen – guitar, drums, synthesizer, percussion, vocals, engineer, additional production
Pete Thomas – guitar
Rob Schnapf – guitar
Steve Abagon – guitar
Peter Atanasoff – guitar, oud, background vocals
Joey Maramba – bass guitar
Jay Bellerose – drums
Joey Waronker – drums
Lee Cantelon – background vocals
Jonathan Stearns – trumpet

References

2007 albums
Rickie Lee Jones albums
Albums produced by Rob Schnapf
New West Records albums